Khotenskoye is a rural locality (a selo) in Novoalexandrovskoye Rural Settlement, Suzdalsky District, Vladimir Oblast, Russia. The population was 33 as of 2010. There are 2 streets.

Geography 
Khotenskoye is located 38 km southwest of Suzdal (the district's administrative centre) by road. Goritsy is the nearest rural locality.

References 

Rural localities in Suzdalsky District
Vladimirsky Uyezd